Joshua Cooper Ramo (born December 14, 1968) is vice chairman and co-chief executive of Kissinger Associates, the consulting firm of former U.S. Secretary of State Henry Kissinger.  He is also the author of several non-fiction books including two New York Times best-sellers, The Age of the Unthinkable and The Seventh Sense.

Early life and education
Rаmo was rаised in Los Ranchos, New Mexico, on the Rio Grande. He began flying in his late teens and later wrote the book No Visible Horizon about his experiences as a competitive aerobatic pilot. Ramo holds a bachelor's degree in Latin American Studies from the University of Chicago and a master's degree in economics from New York University.

Journalism career
Ramo began his career as a journalist at Newsweek in 1993. He joined Time magazine in 1996 when he was hired by Walter Isaacson. Ramo oversaw the magazine’s digital operations and ran Times digital magazine while also covering technology. In 1998, he became foreign editor of Time, overseeing the magazine's international coverage. He was the youngest senior editor and foreign editor in the history of Time Magazine. During his tenure at the magazine, he wrote more than 20 domestic and international cover stories.

Business career
Prompted by an interest in business and global affairs, Ramo moved to Beijing in 2002. He worked with John L. Thornton, a former president of Goldman Sachs, in China from 2003-2005, when he joined Kissinger Associates as managing director. In 2011, he became vice chairman of Kissinger Associates. In 2015, he became co-chief executive officer.

Fluent in Mandarin, Ramo currently divides his time between Beijing and New York, and serves as advisor to large corporations and investors with a particular focus on large-scale cross-border transactions. He additionally serves on the Board of Directors of Starbucks and FedEx.`

Television career 

In 2008, Ramo served as China analyst for NBC Sports during its coverage of the Beijing Olympic Games. For his work with Bob Costas and Matt Lauer during the Opening Ceremony of the Games he shared in a Peabody and an Emmy award.

In 2018, Ramo rejoined NBC Sports as a contributor and analyst for its coverage of the 2018 Winter Olympics in Pyeongchang, South Korea. However, Ramo was criticized for the insensitive comment he made about Japan–Korea relations and sentiments on Japan among Koreans during NBC's coverage of the game's opening ceremony.

Affiliations
Ramo has been a member of the Leaders 21 project, a term member of the Council on Foreign Relations, a “Young Global Leader” and “Global Leader of Tomorrow” of the World Economic Forum, a Crown Fellow of the Aspen Institute, and a co-founder of the US-China Young Leaders Forum.

Key concepts
The World Economic Forum called Ramo “One of China’s leading foreign-born scholars.”

The Beijing Consensus 
In 2004 he published "The Beijing Consensus," which contrasted the Chinese model of economics and politics with western, "Washington Consensus" models.

Co-Evolution 
In 2011, Ramo proposed a new model of US-China relations based on complexity theory known as “co-evolution.”

Works

No Visible Horizon
In 2003, Ramo published No Visible Horizon: Surviving the World's Most Dangerous Sport, which tackled his training as an aerobatic flyer and the "violent, difficult maneuvers" of the sport.

The Age of the Unthinkable
In 2009, Ramo published The Age of the Unthinkable: Why the New World Disorder Constantly Surprises Us and What We Can Do About It,  which was a New York Times bestseller that was translated into 15 languages. The book applies ideas of chaos theory and complex adaptive systems to problems of foreign policy.

The Seventh Sense
In 2016, Little, Brown & Co. released Ramo's third book, The Seventh Sense: Power, Fortune, and Survival in the Age of Networks, which purports to identify a "new instinct" for networks that characterized new groups in politics, economics and security. Drawing on ideas from technology, history and economics, The Seventh Sense claims that the emergence of constant, widespread connection represents a shift in power that will be as significant as the Enlightenment and Industrial Revolution, leading to a widespread collapse of existing institutions and the emergence of new sources of power. In the book, Ramo proposed a new idea for American grand strategy known as “Hard Gatekeeping” in which the country would develop and use platforms for the control of network topology, but would carefully limit access to those platforms. On June 6, 2016, The Seventh Sense debuted on the New York Times bestseller list at #7, and on May 29, 2016, The Seventh Sense was named to the Washington Post's nonfiction bestseller list for the week of May 26, 2016.

Controversy

Comment on Japan–Korea relations

During NBC's coverage of the 2018 Winter Olympics opening ceremony, Ramo noted that Japan occupied Korea from 1910–45, and then added, "But every Korean will tell you that Japan is a cultural and technological and economic example that has been so important to their own transformation." NBC issued an on-air apology the next morning. NBC later shared that Ramo was hired only for the Opening Ceremony and would have "no further role during the PyeongChang Games." Ramo later issued an apology, stating "I did not intend to minimize or disrespect a part of Korean history that must never be forgotten."

The Korea Times called the comment "incorrect and insensitive." While Norman Pearlstine, former Time Inc. Editor-in-Chief, stated his opinion that Ramo's comments contained elements of truth, but that he also engaged in needless hyperbole, American media outlets were overwhelmingly critical of Ramo's statements, denouncing them as "clueless", "false", and containing "endless generalities".

References

External links

 
 
 
 Joshua Cooper Ramo on MSNBC
 Joshua Cooper Ramo on Fareed Zakaria GPS
 Joshua Cooper Ramo on PBS

Living people
American political journalists
1968 births
American investors
American chief executives
Businesspeople from New York City
American foreign policy writers
American male non-fiction writers
American consulting businesspeople
21st-century American non-fiction writers
International relations scholars
Writers from New York City
Directors of Starbucks
Henry Crown Fellows
People from Los Ranchos de Albuquerque, New Mexico
21st-century American male writers